Huti may refer to: 
Hüti, Hiiu County, a village in Hiiu Parish, Hiiu County, Estonia
Hüti, Võru County, a village in Mõniste Parish, Võru County, Estonia
Huti, Nepal, a village development committee
Huti, a village in Farkhar District, Afghanistan

See also
Hüti (disambiguation)
Houthis